Marilyn Sidelsky (born 29 April 1948) is a Rhodesian former swimmer. She competed in two events at the 1964 Summer Olympics.

References

1948 births
Living people
Rhodesian female swimmers
Olympic swimmers of Rhodesia
Swimmers at the 1964 Summer Olympics
Commonwealth Games competitors for Rhodesia and Nyasaland
Swimmers at the 1962 British Empire and Commonwealth Games
White Rhodesian people
Place of birth missing (living people)